Clingfishes are fishes of the family Gobiesocidae, the only family in the order Gobiesociformes. These fairly small to very small fishes are widespread in tropical and temperate regions, mostly near the coast, but a few species in deeper seas or fresh water. Most species shelter in shallow reefs or seagrass beds, clinging to rocks, algae and seagrass leaves with their sucking disc, a structure on their chest.

They are generally too small to be of interest to fisheries, although the relatively large Sicyases sanguineus regularly is caught as a food fish, and some of the other species occasionally appear in the marine aquarium trade.

Distribution and habitat

Clingfishes are primarily found near the shore in the Atlantic, Indian and Pacific Oceans, including marginal seas such as the Mediterranean, Gulf of Mexico, Caribbean and Gulf of California. The greatest species richness is in tropical and warm temperate regions, but the range of a few extends into colder waters, like Diplecogaster bimaculata (north to Norway), Apletodon dentatus, Lepadogaster candolii and L. purpurea (all three north to Scotland; the last formerly mistaken for the mostly Mediterranean L. lepadogaster), Gobiesox maeandricus (north to Alaska), Gobiesox marmoratus and Sicyases sanguineus (both to southernmost South America), and Gastrocymba quadriradiata (from New Zealand's subantarctic islands).

Clingfishes mainly inhabit shallow rocky reefs and shores, coral reefs, seagrass meadows and algae beds. They often live in places exposed to strong currents and wave action, and some are amphibious. As long as the strongly amphibious, intertidal-living species are kept moist by splashing waves, they can survive for up to three–four days on land, gaining oxygen from the air by the branchial surfaces (gills), skin and perhaps the mouth. At least a few species even tolerate a relatively high degree of water loss when on land.

A relatively small number of species shelter in sea urchins or crinoids. Whether this relationship is obligate (clingfish always with a sea urchin or crinoid) or facultative (clingfish sometimes with a sea urchin or crinoid) varies with species. In some, only young clingfish are obligate and gradually move away as they become adult. Three clingfish species, the Australian Cochleoceps bicolor and C. orientalis, and the warm East Atlantic  Diplecogaster tonstricula, are cleaner fish that will cling onto the bodies of larger fish.

Although several species can occur in brackish water, only seven (Gobiesox cephalus, G. fluviatilis, G. fulvus, G. juniperoserrai, G. juradoensis, G. mexicanus and G. potamius) from warmer parts of the Americas are freshwater fish that live in fast-flowing rivers and streams.

Because of their small size and typical habitat, it is however suspected that still-undiscovered deep-water species remain. Even in shallow coastal waters many clingfish are highly cryptic and easily overlooked, mostly staying under cover, although there are species that are active and will swim in the open. As a consequence their abundance is often not well known. Several species are only known from a single or a few specimens. Species that appear uncommon or rare based on standard methods can actually be common if using methods that are more suitable for detecting them. Studies of better-known species have shown that they can be locally abundant. As many as 23 individuals of Lepadogaster lepadogaster have been documented from a single square metre (more than two individuals per square foot). , the IUCN has evaluated the conservation status of 84 clingfish species (roughly half the species in the family). The majority of these are considered least concern (not threatened), 17 are considered data deficient (available data prevents an evaluation), 8 considered vulnerable and a single endangered. The vulnerable and endangered species all have small distributions, restricted to islands or a single bay. Three Gobiesox species that are restricted to fresh water in Mexico have not been rated by the IUCN, but are considered threatened by Mexican authorities.

Description

Males typically grow larger than females.

Most clingfish species have tapering bodies and flattened heads, appearing somewhat tadpole-like in their overall shape. They lack a swim bladder. The lateral line of clingfish is well developed, but may not extend to the posterior parts of the body. The skin of clingfishes is smooth and scaleless, with a thick layer of protective mucus. In at least Diademichthys lineatus and Lepadichthys frenatus, the mucus production increases if the fish is disturbed. The taste of their mucus is highly bitter to humans and it can kill other fish. This is due to their skin and mucus containing a grammistin-like toxin (the toxin in soapfish, such as Grammistes). Whether any other clingfish has toxins in its skin or mucus is currently unknown. Another defense appears to be present in a couple of Acyrtus and Arcos species. They have a spine at their gill cover and it appears to be connected to a venom gland.

Sucking disc

Clingfish are named for their ability to firmly attach themselves to various surfaces, even in strong water currents or when battered by waves. This ability is aided by their sucking disc, which is located on the underside at the chest and is formed primarily by modified pelvic fins and adjacent tissue. In some species it is divided in two, resulting in a larger front and a smaller rear sucking disc. The sucking disc is covered in tiny hexagons and each of these consists of many microscopic hair-like structures (setae). This is similar to the structures that allow geckos to cling to walls. The sucking disc can be remarkably strong, in some species able to lift as much as 300 times the weight of the clingfish. Gobies (family Gobiidae) can have a similar sucking disc, but unlike that family the single dorsal fin in clingfish is not spiny. In a few clingfish species the disc is reduced or even absent, notably Alabes, which are quite eel-like in their shape and aptly named shore-eels. The sucking disc is also reduced in some deep-water clingfish species.

Colours

Most clingfish species have a cryptic colouration, often brown, grey, whitish, black, reddish or green shades, and in some cases they can rapidly change colour to match their background.

Species of deep water are often orange-red (these long wave-length colours are the first that disappear with depth, making them suitable for camouflage). Diademichthys lineatus, Discotrema species, Lepadichthys caritus and L. lineatus are strongly banded, which may function as a disruptive pattern when among sea urchin spines or crinoid arms, but may also be warning colours, as some members of these genera have poisonous skin and mucus (it is unknown if all of them are poisonous). There are species with colours or patterns that are unsuitable for camouflage. Although Lepadogaster purpurea overall is cryptic, it has a pair of distinct large eyespots on the top of its head. Cochleoceps bicolor, C. orientalis and Diplecogaster tonstricula are yellow to red with fine bluish lines. These three are cleaner fish.

Feeding
Feeding varies depending on exact clingfish species. Most primarily feed on tiny crustaceans (such as amphipods, copepods, isopods, mysids, ostracods and shrimp) or gastropods (limpets and other sea snails). Other small animals that have been recorded in their diet include chitons, bivalves, medium-small crustacean like crabs and barnacles, sea urchins, worms, insect larvae, fish and fish eggs. In some species, cannibalism where a large clingfish eats a smaller clingfish is not uncommon.

Limpets and other shelled invertebrates are well-protected and often strongly attached to the rock surface. Clingfish species that feed extensively on them have developed specialized teeth and techniques to dislodge them. This includes rapidly inserting their relatively large, fang-like front teeth under the edge of the prey to flip it, or jamming the teeth on or under the shell's edge to make a small break. However, the teeth of clingfish vary extensively depending on species. In the opposite extreme of the species with relatively few large teeth is Nettorhamphos radula. This species has 1,800–2,300 microscopic teeth (about ten times more than known from any other clingfish), but its feeding behavior is unknown.

Three clingfish species, Cochleoceps bicolor, C. orientalis and Diplecogaster tonstricula, have become cleaner fish. Large fish approach them and allow the small clingfish onto their body where the clingfish eats tiny parasites. In contrast to this mutualistic relationship, certain clingfish species that live among the spines of sea urchins appear to be part of a more varied relationship. It can be either commensal (the clingfish gains protection from the sea urchin spines, but apparently neither benefits nor is a disadvantage to the sea urchin) or parasitic (the clingfish gains protection, and eats tube feet and pedicellaria from its sea urchin host).

No clingfish species is known to be exclusively herbivorous, but some are omnivorous and will feed extensively on a range of algae (brown, green and red), while other, more strictly carnivorous species may ingest plant material incidentally.

Classification and taxonomy
The classification of the clingfishes varies. FishBase places Gobiesocidae as the only family in the order Gobiesociformes, under the superorder Paracanthopterygii; whereas ITIS place them in the suborder Gobiesocoidei of the order Perciformes, under superorder Acanthopterygii. ITIS lists Gobiesociformes as invalid. The 5th edition of Fishes of the World places the Gobiesociiformes in the clade Percomorpha as part of the series Ovalentaria.

Mostly being very small and often cryptic, new species are regularly discovered and described. A major authoritative work on the family is a monograph that was published in 1955 by J.C. Briggs, but in the half century after its publication, up until 2006, fifty-six new clingfish species were described, or on average more than one per year. This pattern with regular descriptions of new species—and even new genera—has continued since then. , there are 182 recognized clingfish species.

Subfamilies and genera

Subfamilies and genera. The delimination of the subfamilies, and to some extent the genera, is not fully resolved. The 5th edition of Fishes of the World recognises only two subfamilies, Cheilobranchinae and Gobiesocinae. Fishbase does list a third subfamily, the monotypic Protogobiesocinae which contains a single species Protogobiesox asymmetricus, this species having been described in 2016. In 2020 the systematics of Gobiesocidae was reviewed and nine subfamilies were proposed: Cheilobranchinae, Chorisochisminae, Diademichthyinae, Diplocrepinae, Haplocylicinae, Gobiesocinae, Lepadogastrinae, Protogobiesocinae, and Trachelochisminae.

Subfamily Cheilobranchinae

Alabes Cloquet, 1816
Barryichthys Conway, Moore & Summers, 2019
Cochleoceps Whitley, 1943
Nettorhamphos Conway, Moore & Summers, 2017
Parvicrepis Whitley, 1931
Posidonichthys Briggs, 1993

Subfamily Chorisochisminae

Chorisochismus Brisout de Barneville, 1846
Eckloniaichthys Smith, 1943

Subfamily Diademichthyinae

Aspasma Jordan & Fowler, 1902
Aspasmichthys Briggs, 1955
Aspasmodes Smith, 1957
Briggsia Craig & Randall, 2009
Diademichthys Pfaff, 1942
Discotrema Briggs, 1976
Flabellicauda Fujiwara, Conway & Motomura, 2021
Flexor Conway, Stewart & Summers, 2018
Lepadichthys Waite, 1904
Lepadicyathus Prokofiev, 2005
Liobranchia Briggs, 1955
Lissonanchus Smith, 1966
Pherallodus Briggs, 1955
Pherallodichthys Shiogaki & Dotsu, 1983
Propherallodus Shiogaki & Dotsu, 1983
Unguitrema Fricke, 2014

Subfamily Diplocrepinae

Diplocrepis Günther, 1861

Subfamily Gobiesocinae

Acyrtops Schultz, 1951
Acyrtus Schultz, 1944
Arcos Schultz, 1944
Derilissus Briggs, 1969
Gobiesox Lacepède, 1800
Rimicola Jordan & Evermann, 1896
Sicyases Müller & Troschel, 1843
Tomicodon Brisout de Barneville, 1846

Subfamily Haplocylicinae

Gastrocyathus Briggs, 1955
Gastrocymba Briggs, 1955
Gastroscyphus Briggs, 1955
Haplocylix Briggs, 1955

Subfamily Lepadogastrinae

Apletodon Briggs, 1955
Diplecogaster Fraser-Brunner, 1938
Gouania Nardo, 1833
Lepadogaster Goüan, 1770
Lecanogaster Briggs, 1957
Opeatogenys Briggs, 1955

Subfamily Protogobiesocinae

Protogobiesox Fricke, Chen & Chen, 2016
Gymnoscyphus Böhlke & Robins, 1970
Kopua Hardy, 1984

Subfamily Trachelochisminae

Dellichthys Briggs, 1955
Trachelochismus Brisout de Barneville, 1846

Incertae Sedis

Aspasmogaster Waite, 1907
Conidens Briggs, 1955
Creocele Briggs, 1955
Modicus Hardy, 1983

References

External links
 Smith, J.L.B. 1964. The clingfishes of the Western Indian Ocean and the Red Sea. Ichthyological Bulletin; No. 30. Department of Ichthyology, Rhodes University, Grahamstown, South Africa.

 
Ray-finned fish families